The 1957–58 NCAA men's basketball rankings was made up of two human polls, the AP Poll and the Coaches Poll.

Legend

AP Poll

UP Poll

References 

1957-58 NCAA Division I men's basketball rankings
College men's basketball rankings in the United States